James Robert Romak (born September 30, 1985) is a Canadian former professional baseball player. He played in Major League Baseball (MLB) for the Arizona Diamondbacks and Los Angeles Dodgers, Nippon Professional Baseball (NPB) for the Yokohama DeNA BayStars, and the KBO League for the SK Wyverns/SSG Landers. Romak has also competed for the Canadian national baseball team.

Amateur career
Romak attended A.B. Lucas Secondary School in London, Ontario, Canada.

Professional career

Atlanta Braves
He was selected by the Atlanta Braves in the fourth round (127th overall) of the 2003 MLB draft. He made his professional debut with the Gulf Coast Braves of the Rookie-level Gulf Coast League in 2003, and played for the Danville Braves of the Rookie-level Appalachian League in 2004 and 2005. He was promoted to the Rome Braves of the Class-A South Atlantic League (SAL) in 2006, where he had a .247 batting average, 26 doubles, 16 home runs and 68 runs batted in.

Pittsburgh Pirates
Before the 2007 season, the Braves traded Romak with Adam LaRoche to the Pittsburgh Pirates for Mike Gonzalez and Brent Lillibridge. The Pirates assigned Romak to the Hickory Crawdads of the SAL, before promoting him to the Lynchburg Hillcats of the Class-A Advanced Carolina League. Before the 2008 season, Baseball Prospectus rated Romak as the Pirates sixth best prospect. Romak split the 2008 and 2009 seasons with the Hillcats and Altoona Curve of the Class-AA Eastern League.

Kansas City Royals
Romak signed with the Kansas City Royals as a minor league free agent for the 2010 season. With the Wilmington Blue Rocks of the Carolina League, Romak was named Player of the Week three times in June, winning Player of the Month honours as well. Romak batted .251 with 23 home runs for the Northwest Arkansas Naturals of the Class-AA Texas League in 2011. He resigned with the Royals for 2012.

St. Louis Cardinals
On May 17, 2012, Romak was traded to the St. Louis Cardinals for cash considerations. Romak spent most of the 2012 season with Cardinals Double-A affiliate Springfield. In December 2012 Romak re-signed with the Cardinals for 2013 and spent the season with the Triple-A Memphis Redbirds.

Los Angeles Dodgers
On November 16, 2013, he signed a minor league contract with the Los Angeles Dodgers and was assigned to the Triple-A Albuquerque Isotopes. In 108 games for the Isotopes in 2014, he hit .280 with 24 homers and 85 RBI.

He was called up to the Dodgers on May 28, 2014, after 1,069 games and 4,306 plate appearances in the minor leagues. He ground out to second base in his MLB debut, as a pinch hitter. His first hit was a 2-RBI double off Matt Belisle of the Colorado Rockies on June 8, 2014. That was his only hit in 21 at-bats for the Dodgers. He was designated for assignment on June 25, 2014.

Arizona Diamondbacks
Romak signed with the Arizona Diamondbacks as a minor league free agent in November 2014.

On August 8, 2015, the Diamondbacks selected his contract from the Triple-A Reno Aces. On November 10, 2015, The Diamondbacks released Romak.

Yokohama DeNA BayStars
On November 13, 2015 he signed with the Yokohama DeNA BayStars of Nippon Professional Baseball.

March 25, 2016, Romak made his NPB debut.

San Diego Padres
On November 8, 2016, Romak signed a minor league deal with the San Diego Padres.

SK Wyverns/SSG Landers
On May 7, 2017, Romak had his contract sold to the SK Wyverns of the KBO League.vOn May 11, 2017, Romak made his KBO debut. During the 2020/2021 offseason, the Wyverns rebranded as the SSG Landers. On October 31, 2021, Romak announced his retirement from professional baseball. In 5 seasons in the KBO for the Wyverns/Landers, Romak played in 626 games, hitting .273/.376/.532 with 155 home runs and 409 RBI, and won the Korean Series with the team in 2018.

International career
Romak has played for the Canada national baseball team. He participated in the 2007 Baseball World Cup, the 2011 Baseball World Cup, winning the bronze medal, and the 2011 Pan American Games, winning the gold medal. The 2011 Canadian team was inducted in the Canadian Baseball Hall of Fame.

References

External links

Minor league baseball.com

1985 births
Living people
Albuquerque Isotopes players
Altoona Curve players
Arizona Diamondbacks players
Baseball people from Ontario
Baseball players at the 2011 Pan American Games
Canadian expatriate baseball players in Japan
Canadian expatriate baseball players in South Korea
Canadian expatriate baseball players in the United States
Danville Braves players
El Paso Chihuahuas players
Gulf Coast Braves players
Hickory Crawdads players
KBO League first basemen
KBO League left fielders
KBO League right fielders
KBO League second basemen
KBO League third basemen
Los Angeles Dodgers players
Lynchburg Hillcats players
Major League Baseball outfielders
Major League Baseball players from Canada
Memphis Redbirds players
Nippon Professional Baseball first basemen
Nippon Professional Baseball third basemen
Nippon Professional Baseball outfielders
Northwest Arkansas Naturals players
North Shore Honu players
Omaha Storm Chasers players
Pan American Games gold medalists for Canada
Pan American Games medalists in baseball
Reno Aces players
Rome Braves players
Scottsdale Scorpions players
SSG Landers players
Springfield Cardinals players
Sportspeople from London, Ontario
Tiburones de La Guaira players
Canadian expatriate baseball players in Venezuela
Toros del Este players
Canadian expatriate baseball players in the Dominican Republic
Wilmington Blue Rocks players
Yokohama DeNA BayStars players
World Baseball Classic players of Canada
2017 World Baseball Classic players
Medalists at the 2011 Pan American Games